The 2010 Cuyahoga County Council election was held on November 2, 2010 to elect all 11 members of the newly formed County Council of Cuyahoga County, Ohio. This was the first held under the newly ratified Charter of Cuyahoga County, which replaced Cuyahoga's 200 year old Board of County Commissioners with an executive and legislature.

Democrats won control of the body with 8 seats to the 3 won by Republicans.

District 1

Democratic primary

Primary results

Republican primary

Primary results

Libertarian primary

Primary results

General election

Results

District 2

Democratic primary

Primary results

Republican primary

Primary results

General election

Results

District 3

Democratic primary

Primary results

Republican primary

Primary results

Green primary

Primary results

General election

Results

District 4

Democratic primary

Primary results

Republican primary

Primary results

General election

Results

District 5

Democratic primary

Primary results

Republican primary

Primary results

General election

Results

District 6

Democratic primary

Primary results

Republican primary

Primary results

General election

Results

District 7

Democratic primary

Primary results

Republican primary

Primary results

General election

Results

District 8

Democratic primary

Primary results

Republican primary

Primary results

General election

Results

District 9

Democratic primary

Primary results

General election

Results

District 10

Democratic primary

Primary results

Republican primary

Primary results

General election

Results

District 11

Democratic primary

Primary results

Republican primary

Primary results

General election

Results

References

Cuyahoga County Council
Cuyahoga County Council
2010 Council
Cuyahoga County Council